Crelly is a moorland in the parish of Wendron in Cornwall, England. On the edges of the moor are Crelly Farm, Crelly Barton and Higher Crelly Farm.

References

Moorlands of Cornwall